Canoeing at the 2008 Summer Olympics in Beijing was held from August 11 to 23 at the Shunyi Olympic Rowing-Canoeing Park.

Peter Hochschorner and Pavol Hochschorner from Slovakia became the first slalom canoeists to win three Olympic gold medals.

Qualification

Medal summary

By event

Slalom

Sprint
Men

Women

By nation

References

International Canoe Federation
2008 Olympic Qualification System
Flatwater Racing Quotas Situation after Global Qualification Competition

External links
Canoe/Kayak Flatwater Racing – Official Results Book
Canoe/Kayak Slalom – Official Results Book

 
2008 Summer Olympics events
2008
Olympics